Penumuli is a village in Guntur district of the Indian state of Andhra Pradesh. It is the mandal headquarters of Duggirala mandal in Tenali revenue division.

Geography 
Penumuli is situated to the north of the mandal headquarters, Duggirala,

Government and politics 

Penumuli gram panchayat is the local self-government of the village. It is divided into 12 wards and each ward is represented by a ward member. The village forms a part of Andhra Pradesh Capital Region and is under the jurisdiction of APCRDA.

Transport 

Namburu–Penumuli road connects the village with Namburu. While, Duggirala railway station provides rail connectivity, situated near the village.

Education 

As per the school information report for the academic year 2018–19, the village has a total of 5 Zilla Parishad/Mandal Parishad schools.

See also 
List of villages in Guntur district

References 

Villages in Guntur district